Rudolf Wilke (27 October 1873, Braunschweig - 4 November 1908, Braunschweig) was a German caricaturist and illustrator; best known for his work at the satirical magazine, Simplicissimus.

Life and work 
He was the eldest child of Johannes Wilke, a carpenter.

After serving an artisanal apprenticeship, he attended the building trades school in Holzminden. His artistic inclinations led him in another direction, however, and he took lessons from the landscape painter, Adolf Nickol, at the polytechnic academy in Braunschweig. This was followed by studies at a private drawing school in Munich, and the Académie Julien in Paris.

He decided to settle in Munich, and opened a studio with his friend, the architect Bruno Paul. In 1896, he took part in a competition sponsored by the cultural magazine, Jugend, and was chosen to join their staff. Three years later, the publisher Albert Langen invited him to work at Simplicissimus. 

In 1905 he married , who was also an illustrator.

In 1906 Wilke, along with Olaf Gulbransson, Ludwig Thoma, and Eduard Thöny, persuaded Langen to convert Simplicissimus into a joint stock company, thereby giving more power to the staff to control the journal's direction.

From 1954 to 1993, the city of Braunschweig awarded a "Rudolf Wilke Prize", which included 1,500 Marks for a study trip abroad.  Its first recipient was the graphic artist, . In 1964, a street in Munich's Solln district was named after Wilke.

Selected works

References

Further reading 
 Peter Lufft: Wilke, Rudolf. In: Luitgard Camerer, Manfred Garzmann, Wolf-Dieter Schuegraf (Eds.): Braunschweiger Stadtlexikon, J. H. Meyer Verlag, Braunschweig 1992, pg.248
 Peter Lufft (Ed.): Der Zeichner Rudolf Wilke. Leben und Werk, Städtisches Museum Braunschweig, 1987 (Exhibition catalog)
 Die Wilkes – eine Künstlerfamilie der Moderne aus Braunschweig, Publications of the Städtisches Museum Braunschweig, Vol.73, Braunschweig, 2008

External links 

 

German caricaturists
1873 births
1908 deaths
Artists from Braunschweig
People from the Duchy of Brunswick